Axiidae is a family of thalassinidean crustaceans. It includes the following genera:

Acanthaxius Sakai & de Saint Laurent, 1989
Allaxius Sakai & de Saint Laurent, 1989
Ambiaxius Sakai & de Saint Laurent, 1989
Anophthalmaxius de Man, 1905
Australocaris Poore & Collins, 2009
Axiopsis Borradaile, 1903
Axiorygma Kensley & Simmons, 1988
Axius Leach, 1815
Bouvieraxius Sakai & de Saint Laurent, 1989
Calastacus Faxon, 1893
Calaxiopsis Sakai & de Saint Laurent, 1989
Calaxius Sakai & de Saint Laurent, 1989
Calocarides Wollebaek, 1908
Calocaris Bell, 1853
Coralaxius Kensley & Gore, 1981
Dorphinaxius Sakai & de Saint Laurent, 1989
Eiconaxius Bate, 1888
Eucalastacus Sakai, 1992
Eutrichocheles Wood-Mason, 1876
Formosaxius Komai, Lin & Chan, 2010
Levantocaris Galil & Clark, 1993
Litoraxius Komai & Tachikawa, 2007
Lophaxius Kensley, 1989
Marianaxius Kensley, 1996
Michelaxiopsis Poore & Collins, 2009
Oxyrhynchaxius Parisi, 1917
Parascytoleptus Sakai & de Saint Laurent, 1989
Paraxiopsis de Man, 1905
Paraxius Bate, 1888
Pilbaraxius Poore & Collins, 2009
Planaxius Komai & Tachikawa, 2008
Platyaxius Sakai, 1994
Scytoleptus Gerstaecker, 1856
Spongiaxius Sakai & de Saint Laurent, 1989

References

External links

Thalassinidea
Decapod families